Lucas Allen Weaver (born August 21, 1993) is an American professional baseball pitcher for the Cincinnati Reds of Major League Baseball (MLB). He has previously played for the St. Louis Cardinals, Arizona Diamondbacks and Kansas City Royals.

The Cardinals selected him in the first round of the 2014 MLB draft from Florida State University (FSU), where he played college baseball for the Seminoles. He made his MLB debut on August 13, 2016 for the Cardinals. The Cardinals traded Weaver to the Diamondbacks after the 2018 season.

Early life and career
Weaver grew up a fan of the Tampa Bay Rays. He graduated from DeLand High School in DeLand, Florida, in 2011. He was drafted by the Toronto Blue Jays in the 19th round of the 2011 MLB draft, but did not sign, choosing to go to college.

Weaver attended Florida State University and played college baseball for the Florida State Seminoles from 2012 to 2014. After the 2012 season, he played collegiate summer baseball with the Brewster Whitecaps of the Cape Cod Baseball League. As a sophomore in 2013, he had a 7–2 win–loss record with a 2.29 earned run average (ERA) in 17 games (15 starts). In 2014, as a junior, he was 8–4 with a 2.62 ERA in 16 starts.

Professional career

St. Louis Cardinals
The St. Louis Cardinals selected Weaver in the first round with the 27th overall pick of the 2014 Major League Baseball draft. He signed with the Cardinals on June 16 and made his professional debut for the GCL Cardinals. He was promoted to the Palm Beach Cardinals on August 1. In six starts between the two teams, he was 0–1 with a 7.71 ERA and 2.04 WHIP.

Weaver spent 2015 with Palm Beach. He earned the Cardinals July Pitcher of the Month Award after compiling a 3–1 record and an 0.94 ERA in  innings pitched (IP) in five starts. He also struck out 27 and walked only two during the month. Baseball America selected Weaver for the high Class-A minor leagues All-Star team for the 2015 season, In 19 total starts for Palm Beach in 2015, he pitched to an 8–5 record and 1.62 ERA.

Baseball America ranked Weaver as the Cardinals' fourth-best prospect prior to the 2016 season. He did not make his 2016 debut for the Springfield Cardinals until June 4 because of a fractured left wrist sustained while running down fly balls during batting practice in spring training. In their updated mid-season ranking, Baseball America rated Weaver in the top-100 for the first time, at 75th. After posting a 1.40 ERA with 88 strikeouts in 77 innings pitched with Springfield, the Cardinals promoted Weaver to the Memphis Redbirds on August 3.

On August 13, 2016, the Cardinals called Weaver up from Memphis to make his major league debut and start in place of injured starter Michael Wacha against the Chicago Cubs. He struck out his first major league opponent, Dexter Fowler. Weaver pitched four innings, giving up two runs, four hits, three walks and three strikeouts for no decision in an eventual 8–4 win. Weaver spent the remainder of the season with St. Louis. After the season, MLB Pipeline named him the Cardinals 2016 Minor League Pitcher of the Year due to his success with the Springfield Cardinals, where he posted a 6–3 record and 1.40 ERA with 88 strikeouts in 77 innings pitched. The Cardinals also named Weaver their 2016 Minor League Pitcher of the Year. In nine games (eight starts) for St. Louis, he pitched to a 1–4 record and 5.70 ERA.

Weaver began his 2017 season back in Memphis, where he earned the title of Pacific Coast League Player of the Month after posting a 2.19 ERA in 37 innings for the month of May. He was recalled and optioned multiple times during the season before he was recalled for the remainder of the season on August 17. In 15 starts for Memphis, Weaver compiled a 10–2 record and 2.55 ERA and in 13 games (ten starts) for the Cardinals he pitched to a 7–2 record and 3.88 ERA.

Weaver began 2018 with St. Louis as a member of their starting rotation, but was moved to the bullpen in mid-August after compiling a 6–11 record with a 4.67 ERA in 24 starts. He finished the 2018 season with a 7–11 record, a 4.95 ERA, and a 1.50 WHIP in thirty games (25 starts).

Arizona Diamondbacks
On December 5, 2018, the Cardinals traded Weaver, Carson Kelly, Andy Young, and a draft pick to the Arizona Diamondbacks in exchange for Paul Goldschmidt. He appeared in just 12 games in 2019, averaging a 2.94 ERA with 69 strikeouts in  innings.

In 2020, Weaver went 1–9 with a 6.58 ERA and 55 strikeouts over 52 innings. He led the NL in losses. On May 27, 2021, Weaver was placed on the 60-day injured list with a right shoulder strain. On September 1, Weaver was activated from the injured list. Over 13 starts for the 2021 season, Weaver went 3–6 with a 4.25 ERA.

On May 28, 2022, Weaver was placed on the 60-day injured list with an elbow injury. He was activated on June 12.

Kansas City Royals
On August 1, 2022, the Diamondbacks traded Weaver to the Kansas City Royals for infielder Emmanuel Rivera.

On October 26, 2022, Weaver was claimed off waivers by the Seattle Mariners. On November 18, he was non tendered and became a free agent.

Cincinnati Reds
On January 13, 2023, Weaver signed a one-year, $2 million contract with the Cincinnati Reds.

Personal life
Weaver is married to Olivia Weaver. They welcomed their first child, a daughter, in October 2019.

References

External links

Florida State Seminoles bio
 

1993 births
Living people
People from DeLand, Florida
Baseball players from Florida
Major League Baseball pitchers
St. Louis Cardinals players
Arizona Diamondbacks players
Kansas City Royals players
Florida State Seminoles baseball players
Brewster Whitecaps players
Gulf Coast Cardinals players
Palm Beach Cardinals players
Surprise Saguaros players
Springfield Cardinals players
Memphis Redbirds players